is a conglomerate of construction and civil engineering companies headquartered in Osaka, Japan. Its subsidiaries specialize in the architecture of high-rise buildings, health and welfare facilities, shrines & temples, and public civil engineering projects such as airports, harbors, railways, roadways and residential developments.

Overview 
In May 2008, it was decided to transfer Takamatsu Construction to a holding company by transferring its main business division and a portion of its real estate division to Nippon Interior Co., Ltd. After that, the trade name of Nippon Interior changed to Takamatsu Construction Co., Ltd., which later changed to Takamatsu Construction Group Co., Ltd. in October 2008.

As of 2019, the corporation consists of 22 companies split into two groups, one for architecture and the other for civil engineering, led by Takamatsu Corporation and Asunaro Aoki Construction Co., Ltd, respectively.

Corporate Structure 

 Parent holding company
 Construction of private residential and commercial buildings
 Takamatsu Techno Service Co., Ltd.Renovation, repairs and building maintenance
 Takamatsu Estate Co., Ltd.Administration of buildings and condominiums
 Sumino Kogei Co., Ltd.Furniture design and residential/commercial facility construction
 JP Home Co., Ltd.Individual residence design
 Nakamura Shaji Co., Ltd.Design, construction and refurbishment of shrines and temples
 Mibu Corporation Co., Ltd.Real estate sales and mediation
 Nihon Owners Credit Co., Ltd.Financing company for construction work
 Civil engineering and construction of commercial facilities, high-rise buildings, condominiums
 Mirai Construction Co., Ltd.Harbor administration, marine engineering and environmental protection
 Aoki Marine Co., Ltd.Reclamation, dredging and maritime logistics
 M's Co., Ltd.Renovation, repairs and office building maintenance
 Toko Geotech Co., Ltd.Ground improvement, slope engineering and cooling/fireproofing technologies
 Asunaro Road Co., Ltd.Paving and asphalt engineering
 Niigata Mira Co., Ltd.Civil engineering and paving
 Shimada Gumi Co., Ltd.Excavation, research and preservation of archaeological resources
 Takamatsu Construction Group USA, Inc.Holding company for business in the United States

History 

 October 1917: Founded as Shinomatsugumi in Osaka
 June 1965: Founded Shinomatsu Estate Co., Ltd.
 May 1980: Founded Nippon Interior Co., Ltd
 October 1990: Changed name from Shinomatsu to Takamatsu
 October 1997- Listed on Section 2 of the Osaka Securities Exchange
 January 2000: Listed on Section 2 of the Tokyo Stock Exchange
 October 2000: Acquired a stake in the Komatsu Construction Industry Co., Ltd. (which later changed its trade name to Asunaro Construction Co., Ltd.)
 July 2002: Acquired Aokikensetsu Co., Ltd. (Aoki Marine)
 October 2002: Formed GWA (Green Wood Alliance) based on 3 companies: Kasamatsu Construction, Asunaro Construction and Aoki Construction
 April 2004: Merger of Asunaro Construction and Aokikensetsu into Asunaro Aoki Construction Co., Ltd.
 March 2005: Listed in Section 1 of the Tokyo Stock Exchange and Osaka Securities Exchange
 January 2006: Acquired Kongō Gumi, specializing in temple and shrine architecture. Prior to the acquisition, Kongō Gumi was the oldest continuously-operated independent company in the world.
 September 2008: Acquired all shares of Asunaro Aoki Construction
 October 2008: Transition to holding company system. Takamatsu Construction Co., Ltd. changed its business name to Takamatsu Construction Group, Inc., and Nippon Interior Co., Ltd., whose main business was transferred, changed its business name to Shinomatsu Construction Co., Ltd.

References 

Construction and civil engineering companies of Japan
Companies based in Osaka
Construction and civil engineering companies established in 1917
Japanese companies established in 1917